Brimeux is a commune in the Pas-de-Calais department in the Hauts-de-France region in northern France.

Geography
Brimeux is a village situated some 4 miles (7 km) southeast of Montreuil-sur-Mer on the D149 road, in the valley of the river Canche.

History
The village name first appears in 1042 in a royal charter and was then written Brivermacum, a Latin name from the Celtic for bridge. Over the years, it has had different spellings such as Brivamagus, Brivomagus, Brimeaus (in 1153), Brimodio and Brimodium (in 1154), Brimaus in 1226, Brimeul in 1415, Brimeu by 1499, and finally Brimeux, in 1704.

When peat was extracted at Brimeux, a 5 metre long wooden deck, a tin dish and flakes of flint were discovered, indicating that Brimeux had been inhabited before the arrival of the Romans.

Various objects of the Gallo-Roman era were unearthed during the construction of the railway station: coins; weights and the remains of a villa.

The area was ransacked by the invading Normans in 842.

There are traces of the motte of the feudal castle owned by the House of Brimeu, seigneurs of the village.

Sights
 The church.
Built between 1495 and 1524 by the seigneur, Hugh de Melun, in flamboyant Gothic style. The nave was restored in 1860 by the architect Norman Clovis who gave it the character that we see today. The bell tower once housed 3 bells but now only has the one, the others having been confiscated in 1793
 The war memorial erected in 1920.

Population
The inhabitants are called Brimeusois.

See also
Communes of the Pas-de-Calais department

References

External links

 Cyclo Club Brimeux, cycling club of Brimeux

Communes of Pas-de-Calais